María Dussauge Ortiz (born 2 August 1937), commonly known as María Duval, is a Mexican actress and singer who has worked in film, television, and the stage. One of the stars from the Golden Age of Mexican cinema.

Career
Duval made her film debut in the musical Melodías inolvidables (1959), an experience she later described as "a great emotion" and her "favorite memory" of her entire career. She once said that musical was her favorite film genre. She played the romantic interests of Gaspar Henaine "Capulina" in Barridos y regados (1963) and Marco Antonio Campos "Viruta" in Cada quién su lucha and La cigüeña distraída (both 1966).

She acted as Antonio Aguilar's beloved in two films: the Mexican Revolution drama Juan Colorado (1966), where she played the tragic Silvia Guerrero, and the comedy Los alegres Aguilares (1967). She finished her film career in the 1970s with the Blue Demon vehicle La mafia amarilla (1975). She also participated in television productions such as La voz de la tierra (1982) with Joaquín Cordero, Sergio Kleiner, Ana Bertha Lepe, Delia Magaña, and Teresa Velázquez. Her last appearance was in the telenovela María José (1995).

Personal life
María Duval is the aunt of comedian Consuelo Duval.

Selected filmography
The Life of Agustín Lara (1959)
The Living Coffin (1959)
Ruletero a toda marcha (1962)
Santo vs. las Mujeres Vampiro (1962)
Tres muchachas de Jalisco (1964)
Gabino Barrera (1965) 
Martín Romero El Rápido (1966)
Cada quién su lucha (1966)
Juan Colorado (1966)
La cigueña distraída (1966)
 Los Bandidos (1967)
Los alegres Aguilares (1967)
La otra mujer (1972)

Discography

Singles
"Todo y nada" (Peerless Records)

Studio albums
Dos gallos y dos gallinas (RCA Víctor)

References

External links

"Todo y nada", a bolero song by María Duval (for Peerless Records) at YouTube

1937 births
Living people
People from Querétaro
Mexican film actresses
Mexican television actresses
Mexican stage actresses
Mexican women singers
Bolero singers
Ranchera singers
Golden Age of Mexican cinema
20th-century Mexican actresses
Singers from Querétaro